South Kodikulam is a panchayat town in Virudhunagar district in the Indian state of Tamil Nadu.

Demographics
 India census, Sapthur Kodikulam had a population of 17,975. Males constitute 50% of the population and females 50%. Sapthur Kodikulam has an average literacy rate of 66%, more than the national average of 59.5%: male literacy is 48%, and female literacy is 42%. In South Kodikulam, 10% of the population is under 6 years of age.

References

Cities and towns in Virudhunagar district